"What Men Live By" is a short story written by Russian author Leo Tolstoy in 1885. It is one of the short stories included in his collection What Men Live By, and Other Tales, published in 1885. The compilation also included the written pieces "The Three Questions", "The Coffee-House of Surat", and "How Much Land Does a Man Need?".

Aleksandr Solzhenitsyn refers to the story in Cancer Ward.

Characters
Simon – A humble and poor shoemaker.

Matryona – Simon's wife.

Michael – An angel punished by God for his disobedience and turned into a mortal.

Plot

A kind, humble and poor shoemaker named Simon goes out one day to purchase sheep-skins in order to sew a winter coat for his wife and himself to share.  Usually, the little money which Simon earns would be spent to purchase food for his family. However, Simon decides that in order to afford the skins he must go on a collection to receive the five rubles and twenty kopeks owed to him by his customers.  As he heads out to collect the money he also borrows a three-rouble note from his wife's money box.  While going on his collection he only manages to collect the twenty kopeks rather than the full amount.  Feeling disheartened by this, Simon rashly spends the twenty kopeks on vodka and starts to head back home drunkenly, stumbling and talking to himself, cursing the coat dealer. He states that he is warm without the vodka and that he won't make it through the winter without a fur coat.

While approaching the chapel at the end of the road, Simon stops and notices something pale-looking leaning against it.  He looks closer and notices that it is a naked man who appears poor of health. Initially, he is suspicious and fears that the man may have bad intentions if he is in such a state, assuming Simon to be a drunkard. He proceeds to pass the man until he sees that the man has lifted his head and is looking towards him.  After some contemplation, Simon feels ashamed for his disregard and heads back to help the man.

Simon takes off his cloth coat and wraps it around the stranger.  He also gives him the extra pair of boots he was carrying.  He aids him as they both walk toward Simon's home.  Though they walk together side by side, the stranger barely speaks and when Simon asks how he was left in that situation the only answers the man would give are: "I cannot tell" and "God has punished me."  Meanwhile, Simon's wife Matryona contemplates whether or not to bake more bread for the night's meal so that there is enough for the following morning's breakfast.  She decides that the loaf of bread that they have left would be ample enough to last until the next morning.  As she sees Simon approaching the door she is angered to see him with a strange man who is wrapped in Simon's clothing.

Matryona immediately expresses her displeasure with Simon, accusing them both to be drunkards and harassing Simon for not returning with the sheep-skin needed to make a new coat. Once the tension settles down, she bids that the stranger sit down and have dinner with them. After seeing the stranger take bites at the bread she placed for him on his plate, she begins to feel pity and shows so in her face. When the stranger notices this, his grim expression lights up immediately and he smiles for one brief moment.  After hearing the stranger's story of Simon's kind behavior towards him, Matryona grabs more of Simon's old clothing and gives it to the stranger.

The following morning Simon addresses the stranger and asks his name. The stranger reveals his name to be Michael. Simon explains to Michael that he can stay in his household as long as he can earn his keep by working as an assistant for Simon in his shoemaking business. Michael agrees to these terms and for a few years he remains a very faithful assistant.

One winter day a nobleman comes in their shop. The nobleman outlines strict conditions for the construction of a pair of thick leather boots: they should not lose shape nor become loose at the seams for a year, or else he would have Simon arrested. When Simon gives to Michael the leather that the nobleman had given them to use, Michael appears to stare beyond the nobleman's shoulder and smiles for the second time since he has been there. As Michael cuts and sews the leather, instead of making thick leather boots, he makes a pair of soft leather slippers. Simon is too late when he notices this and cries to Michael asking why he would do such a foolish thing. Before Michael can answer, a messenger arrives at their door and gives the news that the nobleman has died and asks if they could change the order to slippers for him to wear on his death bed. Simon is astounded by this and watches as Michael gives the messenger the already-made leather slippers. Time continues to go by and Simon is very grateful for Michael's faithful assistance.

In the sixth year, another customer comes in who happens to be a woman with two girls, one of which is crippled. The woman requests if she could order a pair of leather shoes for each of the girls — three shoes of the same size, since they both share the same shoe size, and another shoe for the crippled girl's lame foot. As they are preparing to fill the order Michael stares intently at the girls and Simon wonders why he is doing so.  As Simon takes the girls' measurements he asks the woman if they are her own children and how was the girl with the lame foot crippled. The woman explains that she has no relation to them and that the actual mother on her deathbed accidentally crushed the leg of the crippled girl. She expresses that she could not find it in her heart to leave them in a safe home or orphanage and adopted them as her own. When Michael hears this, he smiles for the third time since he has been there.

After the woman and the two children finally left, Michael approaches Simon and bids him farewell explaining that God has finally forgiven him. As Michael does this he begins to be surrounded by a heavenly glow and Simon acknowledges that he is not an ordinary man.  Simon asks him why light emits from him and why did he smile only those three times. Michael explains that he is an angel who was given the task to take away a woman's life so she could pass on to the next life.  He allowed the woman to live because she begged that she must take care of her children for no one other than their mother could care for them. When he did this God punished him for his disobedience and commanded that he must find the answers to the following questions in order to be an angel again: What dwells in man?, What is not given to man?, and What do men live by?  After Michael returned to earth to take the woman's soul, the woman's lifeless body rolled over and crushed the leg of the now crippled girl.  Then Michael's wings left him and he became a naked and mortal man.  When Simon rescued him he knew that he must start finding the answers to those questions. He learned the answer to the first question when Matryona felt pity for him, thus smiling and realizing that what dwells in man is "love".  The answer to the second question came to him when he realized that the angel of death was looming over the nobleman who was making preparations for a year though he would not live till sunset; thus Michael smiled, realizing that what is not given to man is "to know his own needs."  Lastly, he comprehended the answer to the final question when he saw the woman with the two girls from the mother, whose soul he previously did not take, thus smiling and realizing that regardless of being a stranger or a relation to each other, "all men live not by care for themselves but by love."  Michael concludes, saying, "I have now understood that though it seems to men that they live by care for themselves, in truth it is love alone by which they live.  He who has love, is in God, and God is in him, for God is love."  When Michael finishes, he sings praises to God as wings appear on his back and he rises to return to heaven.

See also
Bibliography of Leo Tolstoy
Twenty-Three Tales

External links

 English Text
 What Men Live By, at RevoltLib.com
 What Men Live By, at Marxists.org
 What Men Live By, at TheAnarchistLibrary.org
 English Audio
 What Men Live By, at Archive.org
 

1885 short stories
Short stories by Leo Tolstoy
Parables
Angels in popular culture